The 1931 Georgia Bulldogs football team represented the Georgia Bulldogs of the University of Georgia during the 1931 Southern Conference football season. Members of the Southern Conference, the Bulldogs completed the season with an 8–2 record (6–1 SoCon). The two losses were to the Rose Bowl and national champion USC Trojans, and to SoCon champion and the team defeated by USC in the Rose Bowl, the Tulane Green Wave.

Before the season
Georgia's team was led by a group of veterans in end Catfish Smith, fullback Jack "The Ripper" Roberts and captain and quarterback Austin Downes. Buster Mott was a promising sophomore.

Schedule

Season summary

Yale

For the third straight year, Georgia's Bulldogs triumphed over "superstar" Hall of Famer Albie Booth and Yale's Bulldogs 26–7. Yale once had the ball on its own 45-yard line. "Tommy Taylor dropped back to pass. Catfish Smith hit Taylor as he released the ball and the wobbly toss was grabbed by guard Red Leathers of Georgia, who proceeded to dash 40 yards to the touchdown." Before the first half was over, Homer Key ran for a 74-yard touchdown, starting through right and cutting back. "He was surrounded by blue-clad players. He shuttled in and out like a white needle in haystack of blue, and finally he shout out and streaked for the goal."

In the fourth quarter, after a short punt, Austin Downes connected with Key on a 27-yard touchdown pass. Later, Dickens intercepted Booth's pass at the 29-yard line, and Georgia drove it in with Gilmore finally going over to end the scoring.

The starting lineup was Crenshaw (left end), Townsend (left tackle), Patterson (left guard), Batchelder (center), Maddux (right guard), Cooper (right tackle), Wilson (right end), Downes (quarterback), Chandler (left halfback), Mott (right halfback) White (fullback).

Florida
The Bulldogs beat Charlie Bachman at Florida for the first time 33–6. Both Florida governor Doyle E. Carlton and Georgia governor Richard B. Russell attended the game. Florida scored when Scabby Phiel blocked a punt. Georgia scored in every period.

Tulane

Georgia lost to the eventual SIAA champion Tulane Green Wave 20–7. Tulane scored first on a 33-yard pass from Don Zimmerman to Vernon Haynes. Nollie Felts plunged in from the 1-yard line for the next touchdown. A pass from Georgia's Homey Key to Buster Mott netted 60 yards and a touchdown. After a botched punt, a double pass play led to Payne sprinting around left end for Tulane's final score.

USC
Georgia was beaten by the national champion USC Trojans 60–0.

References

Georgia
Georgia Bulldogs football seasons
Georgia Bulldogs football